We Kyung-yong (born 23 March 1940) is a former South Korean cyclist. He competed in the individual road race at the 1964 Summer Olympics.

References

External links
 

1940 births
Living people
South Korean male cyclists
Olympic cyclists of South Korea
Cyclists at the 1964 Summer Olympics
Place of birth missing (living people)